The Spiderwick Chronicles is a video game adaptation of the film of the same name. It was released on February 6, 2008 for Windows, Nintendo DS, Wii, Xbox 360 and PlayStation 2.

Plot

When Jared, Simon and Mallory Grace move into the Spiderwick estate, they discover the late owner's field guide to fairies. They soon discover a hidden world all around them, populated with creatures such as brownies, goblins and sprites. However, Jared and his family are in grave danger, because Mulgarath, an ogre, wants to steal the book for himself.

Gameplay
The principle playable characters are Jared, Simon and Mallory, and Thimbletack can be used to explore small areas. Each character has a unique weapon with which to fight against evil creatures. The Grace children can capture Sprites to give them special power-ups.

In the Wii version, either the classic controller or the Wii Remote and Nunchuk can be used.

Reception

References

2008 video games
Nintendo DS games
PlayStation 2 games
Wii games
Xbox 360 games
Windows games
Video games based on films
Video games based on adaptations
Video
Multiplayer and single-player video games
Video games developed in the United States
Video games set in New England